Baima is a town of Beiliu, Guangxi, China. , it administers Baimaxu Residential Community and the following nine villages:
Baima Village
Huangjin Village
Muyong Village
Dongtang Village
Dongwei Village
Chaxin Village
Huanglong Village
Jintou Village
Gendong Village

References

Towns of Guangxi
Beiliu